Paracoptops isabellae is a species of beetle in the family Cerambycidae. It was described by Gilmour in 1947. It is known from Sulawesi.

References

Mesosini
Beetles described in 1947